Albion was launched at Shields in 1801, possibly under another name. She first appeared as Albion in 1804. Her crew abandoned her at sea in 1807.

Career
Albion first appeared in Lloyd's Register (LR) in 1804.

Loss
In January 1808, Lloyd's List reported that the crew of Albion, Pawson, master, had deserted their vessel at sea. She had been on her way from Grenada. Magnet, coming from Surinam, took up the crew and came into the Downs.

Citations

1801 ships
Age of Sail merchant ships of England
Maritime incidents in 1807